Achatinella leucorraphe is a species of air-breathing land snail, a terrestrial pulmonate gastropod mollusk in the family Achatinellidae. This species is endemic to Hawaii.

References

leucorraphe
Molluscs of Hawaii
Endemic fauna of Hawaii
Critically endangered fauna of the United States
Gastropods described in 1873
Taxonomy articles created by Polbot
Taxobox binomials not recognized by IUCN